Dr. Robert C. Stevenson (17 February 1886 – 4 September 1973) was a Scotland international rugby union player. He also represented the Barbarians and the British and Irish Lions.

Rugby Union career

Amateur career

He played rugby union for St Andrews University.

Provincial career

He played for the combined North of Scotland District against the South of Scotland District on 10 December 1910.

He played for the Blues Trial side against the Whites Trial side on 21 January 1911 and captained the side, while still with St. Andrews University.

International career

He played 6 matches for Scotland.

He was a member of the 1910 British Lions tour to South Africa, and played in 15 games, including three of the Test matches against the South African national team.

He also played for the Barbarians.

Medical career

Stevenson attended Kirkcaldy High School, and went to the University of St Andrews, where he studied medicine. He then became a doctor.

References

Sources

 Bath, Richard (ed.) The Scotland Rugby Miscellany (Vision Sports Publishing Ltd, 2007 )
 Godwin, Terry Complete Who's Who of International Rugby (Cassell, 1987)
 Massie, Allan A Portrait of Scottish Rugby (Polygon, Edinburgh)

1886 births
1973 deaths
Scottish rugby union players
Scotland international rugby union players
Rugby union players from Perth, Scotland
British & Irish Lions rugby union players from Scotland
Barbarian F.C. players
Alumni of the University of St Andrews
University of St Andrews RFC players
Blues Trial players
North of Scotland (combined side) players
Rugby union forwards